Sanchayaka is a scheme introduced in Indian schools, to encourage students to save money. Under this scheme, children may deposit money into their account and earn variable interest.  The student may withdraw the money anytime. It was first introduced by Indira Gandhi.

Education finance in India
Government schemes in India